Waterloo is an unincorporated community in Irwin County, in the U.S. state of Georgia.

History
A post office called Waterloo was established in 1896, and remained in operation until 1903. According to tradition, the community received its name from the failed business dealings of a first settler, i.e. he "met his Waterloo".

References

Unincorporated communities in Georgia (U.S. state)
Unincorporated communities in Irwin County, Georgia